Saragooru Nanjangud is a small village in Mysore district of Karnataka state, India.

Location
Saragooru village is located on the road from Nanjangud to T.Narasipur.

Demographics
There are 553 families living in the village with a total population of 2,283. Literacy rate is 65%.

Administration
As per constitution of India and Panchyati Raaj Act, Saragooru village is administrated by Sarpanch (Head of Village) who is elected representative of village.

See also
 Sargur, H.D.Kote

References

Villages in Mysore district